Claude Lhotecký (born 22 February 2001) is a Czech footballer who currently plays as a midfielder for Kroměříž on loan from Zbrojovka Brno.

Club career

FC Zbrojovka Brno
He made his professional debut for Zbrojovka Brno in the home match against Sigma Olomouc on 20 September 2020, which ended in a loss 2:4.

References

External links
 Profile at FC Zbrojovka Brno official site
 Profile at FAČR official site

2001 births
Living people
Czech footballers
FC Zbrojovka Brno players
Association football midfielders
Footballers from Brno